James Jardine  (6 June 1846 – 6 January 1909) was an English first-class cricketer, academic, barrister and judge.

The son of William Jardine, he was born at Dunstable in June 1846. He was educated at Dunstable School, before going up to Caius College, Cambridge. He became a fellow at Caius in 1870. A student of the Inner Temple, he was called to the bar in January 1871. Jardine played first-class cricket for the Marylebone Cricket Club on four occasions between 1870 and 1874, scoring 53 runs with a highest score of 21. Jardine was appointed the Perry Professor of jurisprudence at Bombay University in British India in 1877, where he later served as the dean of the Faculty of Law. He was appointed a judge of the Bombay High Court in January 1886. Jardine died in Switzerland at St Moritz in January 1909, following a short illness with pneumonia.

References

External links

1846 births
1909 deaths
People from Dunstable
Alumni of Gonville and Caius College, Cambridge
Fellows of Gonville and Caius College, Cambridge
English cricketers
Marylebone Cricket Club cricketers
Members of the Inner Temple
English barristers
Academic staff of the University of Mumbai
Deans of law schools in India
Judges of the Bombay High Court
19th-century King's Counsel
20th-century King's Counsel
Deaths from pneumonia in Switzerland